Tokyo Performance Doll also known as TPD (東京パフォーマンスドール) is a J-pop idol girl group that existed from 1990 to 1996 and was revived in 2013. Inspired by Onyanko Club, it had seven main members and several other "trainees" for live performances, a formula later followed by Morning Musume, Hello! Project and  AKB48. TPD was based in Tokyo, and launched sister-bands in other cities: Osaka Performance Doll in 1993 and Shanghai Performance Doll in 1996. TPD had numerous sub-groups that issued their own singles, while albums were issued collectively. Among TPD's main members were Ryoko Shinohara and East End X Yuri's Yuri Ichii. Trainee members included Yoko Kamon and Yuko Fueki (Yoo Min). In June 2013, it was announced that after 17 years, the group was being revived with an all new line up.
 Their music has also been featured in anime series such as Ace Attorney, The Kindaichi Case Files, Ultimate Otaku Teacher, and Beatless.
It was announced on May 27, 2021 that the group will be suspending all activities indefinitely after their concert on September 26, 2021 citing lack of events due to the COVID-19 pandemic.

Revived line-up (2014–2021)
Nana Takashima (leader)
Seira Jonishi
Saki Sakurai
Kaho Hamasaki
Akari Waki
Sakurako Iida (graduated on 19 April 2018)
Saki Jingu (graduated on 19 April 2018)
Anyu Kobayashi (graduated on 19 April 2018)
Futaba Tachibana
Sana Minami (graduated on 25 January 2014)

Former members (1990–1996)
Ryoko Shinohara
Satomi Kihara
Miho Yonemitsu
Chisa Kawamura
Yuri Ichii
Yuko Anai
Mai Yagita

Former secondary members (1990–1996)
Natsuko Kifushi
Kanako Hitsuwari
Shiho Shimazu
Hiromi Seki
Masako Nakagawa
Misako Iwana
Saori Fujimoto
Aya Shinohara
Miho Natori
Fumi Ohto
Asami Azuma
Miyabi Arai
Miho Hirano

Sub-groups
Golbies Ryoko Shinohara, Chisa Kawamura, Satomi Kihara
Harajuku Jennu Ryoko Shinohara Chisa Kawamura,
UL-Says Ryoko Shinohara, Miho Yonemitsu
ViVA! Mai Yagita, Yuko Anai, Yuri Ichii
Two Tops Kanako Hitsuwari, Natsuko Kifushi
Les, TPD Chisa Kawamura, Kanako Hitsuwari, Natsuko Kifushi, Hiromi Seki
Fire Dolls Kanako Hitsuwari, Natsuko Kifushi, Hiromi Seki, Shiho Shimazu
Yonemitsu Club Miho Yonemitsu
TPD DASH!! Natsuko Kifushi, Kanako Hitsuwari, Shiho Shimazu, Hiromi Seki, Masako Nakagawa, Fumi Ohto, Miho Natori, Aya Shinohara, Asami Azuma
Dorusen from TPD (どるせん from TPD)
Aka no Ryusei (赤の流星)
Goo Choki Paa (ぐーちょきぱー)

Discography

Albums
1990.11.21 : Cha-Dance Party Vol. 1
1991.07.25 : Cha-Dance Party Vol. 2
1991.11.02 : ha-Dance Party Vol. 3
1992.07.08 : Tokyo Romance - Cha-Dance Party Vol. 4
1992.12.02 : Catch Your Beat!! - Cha-Dance Party Vol. 5
1993.06.23 : Make It True - Cha-Dance Party Vol. 6
1993.11.10 : Sevn on Seven - Cha-Dance Party Vol. 7
1993.11.10 : TPD Dash !!: Dash!! - Cha-Dance Party Vol. 7.5 (mini-album)
1994.05.01 : TPD Dash !!: Just Fine - Cha-Dance Party Vol. 8
1994.08.01 : Never Stop - Cha-Dance Party Vol. 9
1995.03.08 : TPD Collection from The Early Cha-Dance Party - Cha-Dance Party Vol. 10 (best of)
1995.03.08 : TPD The Remix - Cha-Dance Party Vol. 11
1995.08.02 : check my heart - Cha-Dance Party Vol. 12
2017.01.18 : We Are TPD
2018.11.21 : Hey, Girls!
2020.11.18 : 20 TALES 20 BEATS

Mini-albums
2017.09.13 : Summer Glitter

Solo albums
1993.01.15 : Satomifrom Tokyo Performance Doll
1993.01.15 : Miho from Tokyo Performance Doll
1993.01.15 : Ryoko from Tokyo Performance Doll
1993.01.15 : Chisa from Tokyo Performance Doll
1993.01.15 : Yuri from Tokyo Performance Doll
1993.01.15 : Yuko from Tokyo Performance Doll
1993.01.15 : Mai from Tokyo Performance Doll
1994.12.01 : Yuko Anai - Sin

Singles
1991.07.01 :  Wake Me Up!!
1992.04.08 :  Yume wo
1992.06.21 :  Houkago ha Itsumo Party
1992.10.21 :  Catch!!
1992.11.21 :  Juudai ni Tsumi wa Nai
1993.05.21 :  Kiss wa Shounen wo Rouhi Suru
1993.11.10 :  Diamond wa Kizutsuka Nai
1994.07.01 :  Konya wa Never Stop (radio edit)
2014.06.11 :  Brand New Story (Reached the 8th place on the weekly Oricon Singles Chart.)
2014.11.26 :  Dream Trigger (reached the 4th place on the weekly Oricon Singles Chart.)
2015.06.10 : Dreamin'
2016.03.23 : Gyakkou × Raisan (逆光×礼賛 Backlight × Praise)
2016.08.17 : Junai Chaos (純愛カオス Pure Love Chaos)
2018.03.14 : Trick U
2018.06.06 : Shapeless
2020.06.11 : eyes
2019.06.12 : Super Duper

Digital singles
2016.07.13 : Junai Chaos (純愛カオス)
2017.12.06 : Genjou Daha de Love you (現状打破でLove you)
2020.06.11 : eyes
2020.11.04 : TALES

Videos and DVDs
1991.02.01 : Video Cha-Dance Vol. 0
1991.03.21 : Video Cha-Dance Vol. 1
1991.03.21 : Video Cha-Dance Vol. 2
1991.06.21 : Video Cha-Dance Vol. 3
1991.06.21 : Video Cha-Dance Vol. 4
1991.10.01 : Video Cha-Dance Vol. 5
1991.10.01 : Video Cha-Dance Vol. 6
1993.07.21 : Video Cha-Dance Vol. 7 Live at Tokyo Kousei Nenkin Kaikan 1993.4.6 (Live At 東京厚生年金会館)
1993.07.21 : Video Cha-Dance Vol. 8 Live at Tokyo Kousei Nenkin Kaikan 1993.4.6 (Live At 東京厚生年金会館)
1993.12.01 : That's the Revue 1 Live at Tokyo Kousei Nenkin Kaikan 1993.8.17 Part 1 + Encore Video Cha-Dance Vol. 9 (Live at 東京厚生年金会館 1993.8.17 第1部+アンコール)
1993.12.01 : That's the Revue 2 Live at Tokyo Kousei Nenkin Kaikan * 1993.8.17 Part 2 Video Cha-Dance Vol. 10 (Live at 東京厚生年金会館 1993.8.17 第2部)
1994.11.21 : That's the Revue 1994 Part1 Live at Yokohama Arena 1994.8.7 - Video Cha-Dance Vol. 11
1994.11.02 : That's the Revue 1994 Part2 Live at Yokohama Arena 1994.8.7 - Video Cha-Dance Vol. 12
1995.12.01 : Speed Per Hour 270 km - Video Cha-Dance Vol. 13
2003.12.03 : That's the Revue
2014.01.31 : Play×Live "1×0" Episode 1
2014.01.31 : Play×Live "1×0" Episode 2
2014.01.31 : Play×Live "1×0" Episode 3
2014.01.31 : Play×Live "1×0" Episode 4
2014.01.31 : Play×Live "1×0" Episode 5
2014.08.29 : "Tokyo Goukyuu Kyoushitsu ~ROAD TO 2020~" DVD-BOX vol. 1 (「東京号泣教室 ～Road to 2020～」DVD-Box vol. 1)
2014.12.23 : "Tokyo Goukyuu Kyoushitsu ~ROAD TO 2020~" DVD-BOX vol. 2 (「東京号泣教室 ～Road to 2020～」DVD-Box vol. 2)
2015.03.28 : Play×Live "1×0" New Version Episode 1
2015.03.28 : Play×Live "1×0" New Version Episode 2
2015.03.28 : Play×Live "1×0" New Version Episode 3
2015.03.28 : Play×Live "1×0" New Version Episode 4
2015.03.28 : Play×Live "1×0" New Version Episode 5
2015.07.01 : "Tokyo Goukyuu Kyoushitsu ~Road to 2020~" DVD-Box vol. 3 (「東京号泣教室 ～ROAD TO 2020～」DVD-Box vol. 3)
2015.07.01 : "Tokyo Goukyuu Kyoushitsu ~Road to 2020~" DVD-Box vol. 4 (「東京号泣教室 ～ROAD TO 2020～」DVD-Box vol. 4)
2015.11.18 : Tokyo Performance Doll Zepp Tour TOUR 2015 Haru~ Dance Summit "1×0" ver3.0~ (東京パフォーマンスドール Zepp Tour 2015春〜Dance Summit“1×0 (ワンバイゼロ)”ver3.0〜)
2016.04.08 : "Tokyo Goukyuu Kyoushitsu ~Road to 2020~" DVD-Box vol. 5 (「東京号泣教室 ～Road to 2020～」DVD-Box vol. 5)
2016.04.08 : "Tokyo Goukyuu Kyoushitsu ~Road to 2020~" DVD-Box vol. 6 (「東京号泣教室 ～Road to 2020～」DVD-Box vol. 6)
2017.08.02 : Dance Summit "DREAM CRUSADERS" ~Saikou no Kiseki wo, Saikyou no Family to Tomoni!~ at Nakano Sun Plaza 2017.3.26 (ダンスサミット“DREAM CRUSADERS”～最高の奇跡を、最強のファミリーとともに！～ at 中野サンプラザ 2017.3.26)

Books
1993.08 Tokyo Performance Doll Official Handbook (東京パフォーマンスドール オフィシャルハンドブック)
1995.03 TPD in the case

References

External links
 

Japanese girl groups
Japanese idol groups
Japanese pop music groups
Musical groups from Tokyo
Musical groups established in 1990
1990 establishments in Japan
Musical groups reestablished in 2013